The Route nationale 165 (also European Route 60) is a highway in Brittany.  It connects the towns of Brest and Nantes. It is also numbered European Route 60. The majority of the route is autoroute standard.

Route
The road commences at Brest docks passing the visitor attractions Oceanopolis and Botanical Gardens. Thereafter the road turns south crossing the River Elom on a modern bridge the Pont de l'Iroise.  The older Pont A. Louppe now closed to vehicular traffic lies on the seaward side.   

The road passes the town of Plougastel Daoulas and alongside the coast (a series of submerged valleys) in the Parc Naturale D'Armorique.  The road passes the town of Châteaulin and a junction with the N164 to Rennes and the N12.  The former route taken by the N165 is now numbered by the RD770.  The road enters the town of Quimper crossing the river Odet.  The road now forms the towns eastern by-pass.

The road continues south east with the old road now the RD783 to the south and after the town of Quimperlé it becomes the RD765 where the road crosses the River Laïta.  The road passes the Airport of Lann-Bihoué and forms the northern by-pass for Lorient over the Rivers Scorff and Blavet past Hennebont and a junction with the N24 to Rennes.  The old road continues as the RD765 through the town centre of Lorient and Hennebont rejoining the new road after Landévant. 

The road continues south east to the town of Vannes on the northern shore of the Gulf of Morbihan.  There is a junction with the N166.  The old road is again numbered the RD765 passing through villages now by-passed by the new road.

The road by-passes the town of Muzillac  and crosses the river Vilaine passing the town of La Roche Bernard.  The former road is hereafter numbered the RD965.  The road passes the town of Pontchateau at Savenay there is a junction with the N171 to La Baule and Laval.  The road passes the Loire-Atlantique motor racing circuit before entering the City of Nantes becoming the A844.

External links 

 Route national 165 information on Saratlas (in French)

References 

Routes nationales in France